Charopa is a genus of air-breathing land snails, terrestrial pulmonate gastropod mollusks in the family Charopidae.

Charopa is the type genus of the family Charopidae.

Species
Species within the genus Charopa include:
 Charopa bianca (Hutton, 1883)
 Charopa coma (Gray, 1843) - type species of the genus Charopa
 Charopa lafargei Vermeulen & Marzuki, 2014
 Charopa longstaffae (Suter, 1913)
 Charopa macgillivrayana Iredale, 1913
 Charopa montivaga Suter, 1894
 Charopa pilsbryi (Suter, 1894)
 Charopa pseudocoma Suter, 1894

References

External links

Charopidae